Chrysasura meeki is a moth of the family Erebidae first described by Walter Rothschild in 1916. It is found in New Guinea.

Subspecies
Chrysasura meeki meeki
Chrysasura meeki wollastoni Rothschild, 1915

References

Nudariina
Moths described in 1916